Klausjürgen Wussow (30 April 1929 – 19 June 2007) was a German stage, film and television actor.

Early life 
Wussow was born in Cammin, Province of Pomerania, Weimar Germany (modern Kamień Pomorski, Poland). His father was a teacher and cantor who died 1939 in the Second World War. Wussow had three brothers, an older and two younger (twins). His original career choice was to become a doctor. He couldn't become a doctor and so his new career choice was to become an actor.

Career 
Wussow started with the theatre. From 1964 until 1986 he was a member of the famous theatre Burgtheater in Vienna, Austria. Next to his stage work, he appeared in more than 120 film and television productions between 1958 and 2005.

Wussow was best known for his leading role as Professor Brinkmann in the ZDF medical series The Black Forest Clinic, which was one of the most successful German television series of all time. He later played another leading role as a doctor in the series Klinik unter Palmen, which ran between 1996 and 2003. In the years 2004 and 2005 the Black Forest Clinic had a new edition with two television films. In these movies he played the role of Professor Brinkmann last time, these are his last movies. He was also a writer and painter and a voice actor and announcer in radio plays and audio books. He dubbed Judge Claude Frollo in the German-language version of The Hunchback of Notre Dame (1996).

Personal life 
Wussow was married four times. From 1951 until 1960 he was married to German actress Jolande Frantz. They had one daughter. From 1960 until 1991 he was married to Austrian actress Ida Krottendorf. Together they had two children, a daughter and a son (both are actors too). From 1992 until 2003 he was married to the German journalist Yvonne Viehhöver. They had one son. From 2004 until 2007 he was married to Sabine Scholz, the former wife of the German boxer Bubi Scholz, marriage ended with his death. He had an Austrian honorary citizenship and an Austrian Honorary Professor.

In his last years he was suffering from dementia after some strokes. He died in Rüdersdorf near Berlin. His grave is located in Berlin on the "Waldfriedhof Heerstrasse" cemetery.

Selected filmography 

1958: Blitzmädels an die Front - Oberleutnant Wagner
1959: A Doctor of Conviction (Arzt aus Leidenschaft) - Dr. Wolfgang Friedberg
1960: Agatha, Stop That Murdering! - Jan Fabrizius
1960: The Crimson Circle - Derrick Yale
1960: Soldatensender Calais (Headquarters State Secret) - Jochen Malden, Kapitänleutnant
1960: A Woman for Life - Oberleutnant Baron Ernst Ewald von Bergen
1960: Final Destination: Red Lantern
1960: Agatha, Stop That Murdering! - Dr.Peter Brent
1961: The Green Archer - Inspektor James Lamotte Featherstone / Mr. Lamotte
1961:  (TV film) - Thomas Hudetz
1961:  (Das letzte Kapitel) - Magnus
1961:  - Pierre Jonval, Student
1962: The Hot Port of Hong Kong - Peter Holberg
1964: Dead Woman from Beverly Hills - C.G.
1965:  (TV film) - SS-Hauptsturmführer Lang
1966: High Season for Spies - Johansson / Bonnard
1967: Electra One - Klaus
1970–1971: Der Kurier der Kaiserin (Courier of the Empress, TV Series) - Leutnant Karl von Rotteck
1974: Sergeant Berry (TV Series) - Sergeant Albert Berry
1975: Monika and the Sixteen Year Olds - Monsignore Victor Berend
1975: Am Wege (TV Movie) - Huus
1979: Goetz von Berlichingen of the Iron Hand - Adalbert von Weislingen
1979-1997: Derrick (TV Series) - Gregor Lenau / Jakob Bienert / Hugo Zeller / Dr. Blunk / Martin Gericke / Bernhard Demmler
1981: Der Bockerer - Obersturmbannführer von Lamm
1983: Vom Webstuhl zur Weltmacht (TV Series)
1986: Nägel mit Köpfen - Falscher Graf
1985–1989: The Black Forest Clinic (TV Series) - Prof. Klaus Brinkmann
1986:  - Charles Duhamel / Peter Kent
1992: Die Sonne über dem Dschungel
1994: Venti dal Sud - Rudi
1996–2003: Klinik unter Palmen (TV Series) - Dr. Frank Hofmann
1997: The Fearless Four - Der Erzähler (voice)
2004: Die Schwarzwaldklinik – Die nächste Generation (The Black Forest Clinic – The Next Generation) (TV Movie) - Prof. em. Klaus Brinkmann
2005: Die Schwarzwaldklinik – Neue Zeiten (The Black Forest Clinic – New Times) (TV Movie) - Prof. em. Klaus Brinkmann (final film role)

External links 
 (also includes more personal informations)
Short Biography 
German Fansite about Black Forest Clinic
German Fansite about Klausjürgen Wussow
Publications from and about Klausjürgen Wussow at the German National Library

1929 births
2007 deaths
People from Kamień Pomorski
German male film actors
German male television actors
German male stage actors
German male voice actors
German male radio actors
20th-century German male actors
21st-century German male actors
People from the Province of Pomerania
Officers Crosses of the Order of Merit of the Federal Republic of Germany
Deaths from dementia in Germany